Monica Lin, better known as Thundercup, is an American marketing director and Internet personality of Taiwanese descent. She serves as marketing director at Popular Demand, a Los Angeles-based clothing brand.

Early life
Monica Lin was born and raised in Los Angeles until she was 9 years old. Her parents are Taiwanese. She then moved to Taiwan to live with her mother and attended international school overseas before returning to the U.S. for high school
.

Career
Monica Lin discovered her affinity for fashion through her mother, who exposed her to different international brands, such as Comme des Garçons and Bape. In the early stages of her career, she started a streetwear blog called “Thundercup". Her blog gained momentum when she was the first to debut photos of rapper Lil Wayne's TRUKFIT clothing line. Her blog coverage was posted by various media outlets, with notable ones that included MTV, HipHopDX, and Complex. She used her blog as a networking tool.

In 2012, Lin began working for Popular Demand as an intern. She interned for a month before she got hired after doing product placement for the brand by serving as the stylist for numerous hip hop music videos. One notable music video she styled was rapper E-40’s “Function (Remix)” music video, which featured Problem, Young Jeezy, Chris Brown, French Montana, and Red Café. Since serving as the marketing director for Popular Demand, she has led numerous partnerships and collaborations for the brand, including ones with Roscoe’s Chicken and Waffles, Def Jam Records, rapper Ty Dolla $ign, and Cardi B.

Since 2014, she has been featured in various YouTube videos with The Fung Brothers, including “Life of a Sneakerhead 4 W/ a Girl".

In 2015, she launched a radio show on TheMixShow.com called The Plug with different special guests, including Lil Dicky, who did a freestyle on the show.

Lin has also worked on various collaborations on her own as an influencer with brands including Puma, Nike, Postmates, and The Grammy Awards. She has also been featured in Forbes and Revolt.

References

External links
 Popular Demand website

Year of birth missing (living people)
Living people
American Internet celebrities
American people of Taiwanese descent
People from Los Angeles
American marketing people